Orion Assembly is a  General Motors vehicle assembly plant located in Orion Township, Michigan. The plant currently assembles the Chevrolet Bolt and Cruise AV.  As of September 2019, the plant has approximately 1,032 salaried and hourly employees.  It assumed operations of Buick City, and Pontiac Assembly.

History 
Orion Assembly commenced production on December 1, 1983 with the 1985 model C-body cars. Orion Assembly produced the Chevrolet Malibu and Pontiac G6 until 2009, when the plant was idled due to the General Motors Chapter 11 reorganization of 2009. The plant in suburban Detroit was saved from closure through a $1 billion grants and tax incentives from the state of Michigan, local municipalities and the federal government. Under an agreement with the UAW, the plant began assembling the successor to the South Korean-built Chevrolet Aveo, the Chevrolet Sonic, in 2011 — making it the only subcompact car currently assembled in America. 
Later in 2011, the plant began manufacturing the Buick Verano.

In the past, GM assembled subcompact vehicles in Mexico or in South Korea due to lower cost labor rates in those countries. Under the new agreement with the UAW, GM used domestic laborers earning less than under previous contracts and slimmed down labor rules to make assembling subcompact vehicles in the US economically competitive. For younger workers, wages were cut in half from the standard $28/hour. For the first time, parts supplier employees worked alongside of GM workers on the assembly line. They made as little as $10/hour.  This arrangement replaced GM's previous plan to import a new subcompact vehicle from China.  Orion's bid was selected over those from plants in Wisconsin (Janesville Assembly), and Tennessee (Spring Hill Assembly).

On March 22, 2019, GM announced an additional investment of $300 million and an addition of 400 workers to build a new electric vehicle at Orion. This was later revealed to be a slightly larger version of the Bolt to be known as the Bolt EUV.

Dedication ceremony 
On July 5, 1984, President Ronald Reagan gave a ceremonial dedication speech at the plant. Also in attendance were Michigan Governor James Blanchard, Michigan Senators Carl Levin and Don Riegle, Representative (from the local district) William Broomfield and notable General Motors executives, including chairman and CEO Roger Smith.

During his speech, Reagan commended both GM and the United Auto Workers for their progress in the automotive industry.

Vehicles produced

Current
As of September, 2022:
 Chevrolet Bolt (2017–Present)
 Chevrolet Bolt EUV (2021–Present)

Past
 2012–2020 Chevrolet Sonic
 2017–2019 Opel Ampera-e
 2012–2017 Buick Verano
 2008–2010 Chevrolet Malibu
 2005–2010 Pontiac G6
 2000–2005 Buick LeSabre
 1994-1998, 2000–2005 Pontiac Bonneville
 1995–2003 Oldsmobile Aurora
 1995–1999 Buick Riviera
 1994–1999 Oldsmobile 88
 1997–2005 Buick Park Avenue
 1985-1990 Buick Electra
 1985–1996 Oldsmobile 98
 1985–1993 Cadillac DeVille
 1985–1992 Cadillac Fleetwood
 1987-1993 Cadillac Sixty Special

Notes

References

External links
 

General Motors factories
Motor vehicle assembly plants in Michigan
Buildings and structures in Oakland County, Michigan
1983 establishments in Michigan